Italica was an ancient Roman city in Hispania; its site is close to the town of Santiponce in the province of Seville, Spain. It was founded in 206 BC by Roman general Scipio as a colonia for his Italic veterans and named after them. Italica later attracted new settlers from the Italian peninsula and also grew with the children of Roman soldiers and native women. Among the Italic settlers between the third century BC and first century AD were a branch of the Gens Ulpia from the Umbrian city of Tuder (the Ulpi Traiani) and a branch of the gens Aelia from the Picenian city of Hadria (the Aelii Hadriani), the respective stirpes of the Roman emperors Trajan and Hadrian, who were born in Italica.

According to some authors, Italica was also the birthplace of Theodosius.

History

Foundation

Italica was the first Roman settlement in Spain and the first Roman city outside of Italy. It was founded in 206 BC by Publius Cornelius Scipio during the Second Carthaginian War close to a native Iberian town of the Turdetani (dating back at least to the 4th c. BC) as a settlement for his Italic veterans, likely a majority of socii and a minority of Roman citizens, and named Italica after its inhabitants. The nearby native and Roman city of Hispalis (Seville) was and would remain a larger city, but Italica's importance derived from its illustrious origin and from the fact that it was close enough to the Guadalquivir to control the area.

The vetus urbs (original or "old" city) developed into a prosperous city and was built on a Hippodamian street plan with public buildings and a forum at the centre, linked to a busy river port. Italica thrived especially under the patronage of Hadrian, like many other cities in the empire under his influence at this time, but it was especially favoured as his birthplace. He expanded the city northwards as the nova urbs (new city) and, upon its request, elevated it to the status of colonia as Colonia Aelia Augusta Italica even though Hadrian expressed his surprise as it already enjoyed the rights of "Municipium". He also added temples, including the enormous and unique Traianeum in the centre of the city to venerate his predecessor and adopted father, and rebuilt public buildings.

The city started to dwindle as early as the 3rd century when a shift of the Guadalquivir River bed, probably due to siltation, a widespread problem in antiquity that followed removal of the forest cover, left Italica's river port high and dry while Hispalis continued to grow nearby.

Late Antiquity
The city may have been the birthplace of the emperor Theodosius I and of his eldest son Arcadius (born in Spain in 377 A.D., during his father's exile).

Italica was important enough in late Antiquity to have a bishop of its own, and had a garrison during the Visigothic age. The walls were restored by Leovigildo in 583 AD during his struggles against Hermenegildo.

Rediscovery and excavations

In recent centuries, the ruins became the subject of visits, admiration and despair by many foreign travellers who wrote about and sometimes illustrated their impressions. Italica's prestige, history and fame were not enough, however, to save it from being the subject of continued looting, and a permanent quarry for materials from Ancient times to modern ones. In 1740 the city of Seville ordered demolition of the walls of the amphitheatre to build a dam on the Guadalquivir, and in 1796 the vetus urbs was used to build the new Camino Real of Extremadura. The first law of protection for the site took effect in 1810 under the Napoleonic occupation, reinstating its old name of Italica, and allocating an annual budget for regular excavation.

One of the first excavators was the British textile merchant and Seville resident Nathan Wetherell, who uncovered nearly ten Roman inscriptions in the vicinity of Italica in the 1820s that were later donated to the British Museum. Regular excavation, however, did not materialise until 1839–1840. By Royal Order of 1912 Italica was declared a National Monument, but it was not until 2001 that the archaeological site of Italica and the areas of protection were clearly defined.

The site

As no modern city covered many of Italica's buildings of the nova urbs, the result is an unusually well-preserved Roman city with cobbled Roman streets and mosaic floors still in situ. Many rich finds can also be seen in the Seville Archaeological Museum, with its famous marble statue of Trajan.

The archaeological site of Italica encompasses mainly the nova urbs with its many fine buildings from the Hadrianic period. The original vetus urbs (old town) lies under the present town of Santiponce.

Extensive excavation and renovation of the site has been done recently and is continuing.

The small baths and the Theatre are some of the oldest visible remains, both built before Hadrian.

Italica’s amphitheatre was the third largest in the Roman Empire at the time, being slightly larger than the Tours Amphitheatre in France. It seated 25,000 spectators, about half as many as the Colosseum in Rome. The size is surprising given that the city's population at the time is estimated to have been only 8,000, and shows that the local elite demonstrated status that extended far beyond Italica itself through the games and theatrical performances they funded as magistrates and public officials.

From the same period is the elite quarter with several beautiful (and expensive) houses decorated with splendid mosaics visible today, particularly the:
House of the Exedra 
House of the Neptune Mosaic
House of the Birds Mosaic
House of the Planetarium Mosaic
House of Hylas
House of the Rhodian Patio.

The Traianeum

The Traianeum was a large, imposing temple in honour of the Emperor Trajan, built by his adopted son and successor, Hadrian. It occupies a central double insula at the highest point of nova urbs. It measures 108 x 80 m and is surrounded by a large porticoed square with alternating rectangular and semicircular exedra around its exterior housing sculptures. The temple precinct was decorated with over a hundred columns of expensive Cipollino marble from Euboea, and various fountains.

Aqueduct

The aqueduct of 37 km total length was first built in the 1st c. AD and extended under Hadrian to add a more distant source for supplying the expanded city. It fed a huge cistern at the edge of the city which remains intact. Some of the piers of the arches are still visible near the city.

Gallery

See also 
 Romanization of Hispania

References

External links

 Italica homepage from the Andalusian Council
 Historical overview  from Livius.org
 Italica City Ruins details Exprilo

Roman sites in Spain
Roman towns and cities in Spain
Coloniae (Roman)
206 BC
200s BC establishments
Buildings and structures in the Province of Seville
Former populated places in Spain
Cities founded by Rome
Archaeological sites in Andalusia
Populated places established in the 3rd century BC